Ky Rodwell (born 21 June 1999) is an Australian professional rugby league footballer who plays as a  and  for the Parramatta Eels in the NRL.

Background
Rodwell was scouted by South Sydney in 2015 after a match where he played for the group 16 junior rep team versus the junior Rabbitohs in Cooma, New South Wales. Rodwell played for Souths' Harold Matthews team, making his NYC debut later that year at the age of 17. Rodwell was selected for the Australian Schoolboys team in 2016.

Playing career
Rodwell played for the South Sydney Rabbitohs from 2018 until 2020. Rodwell featured for South Sydney's feeder NSW Cup team the North Sydney Bears before South Sydney brought back their own team into the NSW cup for the 2019 season. Rodwell played for the South Sydney club in Jersey Flegg and NSW Cup in 2019, also representing NSW Under 20's team starting at Prop.

In 2021, Rodwell's contract with South Sydney was not renewed, leading him to sign with the Western Suburbs Magpies NSW Cup team, playing two games for the club before signing with the Parramatta Eels. Rodwell featured constantly for Parramatta in NSW Cup, before COVID-19 outbreak caused the competition to move to Queensland and NSW cup was cancelled for the remainder of the year.

In round 25, 2021 Rodwell made his NRL debut for Parramatta against the Penrith Panthers at Cbus Super Stadium which ended in a 40-6 defeat.  On 7 October 2022, Rodwell re-signed with Parramatta until the end of 2024.
In the same month, Rodwell was named as the Parramatta clubs 'Rookie of the year'.

References

External links
NSW cup profile
Round 25 lineup
NSW under 20's lineup
Get to know Ky Rodwell

1999 births
Living people
Australian rugby league players
North Sydney Bears NSW Cup players
Parramatta Eels players
Rugby league players from Bega, New South Wales
Rugby league props